Valeri Vasilyevich Chetverik (born December 29, 1957, in Tikhoretsk) is a Russian professional football coach.

His son Grigori Chetverik is a football player.

External links
 Career summary by KLISF

1957 births
Living people
Soviet football managers
Russian football managers
FC KAMAZ Naberezhnye Chelny managers
FC Chernomorets Novorossiysk managers
Russian Premier League managers
Russian expatriate football managers
Expatriate football managers in Belarus
FC Belshina Bobruisk managers
People from Tikhoretsk
Sportspeople from Krasnodar Krai